Neil Scott Walker (born June 25, 1976) is an American former competition swimmer, four-time Olympic medalist, and former world record-holder in multiple events.

Walker represented the United States at the 2000 Summer Olympics in Sydney, where he won a silver medal in the men's 4×100-meter freestyle relay, and at the 2004 Summer Olympics in Athens, where he also won a bronze in the 4×100-meter freestyle relay.  He also twice earned gold medals in the 4×100-meter medley relay, after swimming for the winning U.S. team in the preliminary heats.

At the 2000 Short Course World Championships in Athens, Greece, he set short course world records in the 50-meter backstroke, 100-meter backstroke, and 100-meter individual medley.

Walker retired from competitive swimming after the 2008 U.S. Olympic Trials.  He started a swim school with Olympian and former Longhorn teammate Ian Crocker and U.S. National Champion and former Longhorn teammate James Fike, with locations in Austin and Dallas.  He is currently the head coach of Rockwall Aquatics Center of Excellence (RACE) in Rockwall, Texas.

See also
 List of Olympic medalists in swimming (men)
 List of University of Texas at Austin alumni
 List of World Aquatics Championships medalists in swimming (men)
 World record progression 50 metres backstroke
 World record progression 100 metres backstroke
 World record progression 100 metres individual medley
 World record progression 4 × 100 metres freestyle relay
 World record progression 4 × 200 metres freestyle relay

References

External links
 
 
 
 

1976 births
Living people
American male backstroke swimmers
American male freestyle swimmers
American male medley swimmers
World record setters in swimming
Medalists at the 2000 Summer Olympics
Medalists at the 2004 Summer Olympics
Medalists at the FINA World Swimming Championships (25 m)
Olympic bronze medalists for the United States in swimming
Olympic gold medalists for the United States in swimming
Olympic silver medalists for the United States in swimming
Sportspeople from Madison, Wisconsin
Swimmers at the 2000 Summer Olympics
Swimmers at the 2004 Summer Olympics
Texas Longhorns men's swimmers
World Aquatics Championships medalists in swimming
People from Verona, Wisconsin
21st-century American people